The 1983 West of England Championships was a men's tennis tournament played on outdoor grass courts in Bristol, England that was part of the 1982 Volvo Grand Prix. It was the fourth edition of the tournament and was played from 13 June until 19 June 1983. First-seeded Johan Kriek  won the singles title.

Finals

Singles

 Johan Kriek defeated  Tom Gullikson 7–6, 7–5
 It was Kriek's 2nd singles title of the year and the 9th of his career.

Doubles

 John Alexander /  John Fitzgerald defeated  Tom Gullikson /  Johan Kriek 7–5, 6–4
 It was Alexander's 2nd title of the year and the 35th of his career. It was Fitzgerald's 1st title of the year and the 7th of his career.

References

External links
 ITF tournament edition details

Bristol Open
 
Bristol Open
Bristol Open
1983 in English tennis